North Point is a station on the Hong Kong MTR  and the western terminus of the , located in North Point on Hong Kong Island. The livery of the station is tomato orange. The interchange between the Island line and the Tseung Kwan O line is a cross-platform interchange.

History
This station was opened on 31 May 1985 upon the completion of the Island line. Until 2001, the station was only used by that line, and the layout of the station at that time featured a stacked side platform arrangement with trains running towards Sheung Wan station operating on the level above trains running towards Chai Wan station. Between 2001 and 2002, this station was expanded to facilitate a cross-platform interchange with the Kwun Tong line. Since 18 August 2002, this station serves as an interchange station between the two lines as well as the terminus of Tseung Kwan O line.

In 2001, an artwork by architect Tao Ho and local schoolchildren called North Point, My Neighbourhood was installed in the station. It is an illustrated mural depicting familiar sights from around North Point.

Station layout

Compared to cross-platform arrangements at other MTR stations, the transfer distance is longer here; however, it is nevertheless much more convenient for commuters to transfer than passing through the corridors in Quarry Bay station, which provides no cross-platform arrangement.

Entrances/exits
All exits are located on King's Road and the side streets nearby.
A1/A4: Java Road
A2: Marble Road
A3: Odeon Plaza
B1/B2/B3: King's Road
B4: Tsat Tsz Mui Road

Transport connections
North Point is the home of a large bus terminus, situated at the North Point Ferry Pier. (Exit A1) At the same time, other modes of transport like buses, trams and taxis are accessed at King's Road, which can be reached through Exits B1 and B3.

Ferry
The North Point Ferry Pier (entrance/exit A1) provides services to Hung Hom, Kowloon City and Kwun Tong. Passengers who wish to take the ferry should leave North Point station at entrance/exit A1, and follow Shu Kuk Street until they reach the seashore.

Special train 
To relieve overcrowding of the Kennedy Town-bound platform in morning peak hours, a number of trains from Chai Wan Depot run empty and are placed into service at North Point.

Future development 
North Point will become an intermediate station on the Tseung Kwan O line once the  project is completed. Tseung Kwan O line North Point-bound train will run towards  via ,  and  stations, paralleling the Island line. This will significantly relieve the overcrowding on Kennedy Town-bound trains of the Island line during the morning rush hour.

Gallery

See also
 North Island line

References

MTR stations on Hong Kong Island
Island line (MTR)
Tseung Kwan O line
North Point
Railway stations in Hong Kong opened in 1985
1985 establishments in Hong Kong